Joy Chambers (born 1947) is an Australian actress, author, and businesswoman.

Career
Chambers is known for such television soap opera roles as Rita Merrick in The Restless Years, Dr Robyn Porter in The Young Doctors, and Rosemary Daniels in Neighbours. Chambers has played Rosemary on a recurring basis since 1986. Chambers made a brief return to the show in 2005, after line producer Linda Walker emailed her asking if she would return for the 20th anniversary celebrations. She shot her scenes in April on a visit to Melbourne. In May 2010, it was announced that Chambers would again be reprising the role of Rosemary.

Chambers has a keen interest in poetry and literature which began in childhood, with her father encouraging her deep love of the English word. Chambers is an author of historical novels. She is also the International Patron of the Ipswich Poetry Feast.

TELEVISION

Personal life
Chambers was married to media mogul Reg Grundy from 1971 until his death in 2016. She lives in Bermuda.

Net worth

Bibliography
Mayfield (1993)
My Zulu, Myself (1995)
Vale Valhalla (2000)
None But the Brave (2003)
For Freedom (2007)
The Great Deception (2012)

References

External links
Official website

Joy Chambers at Hachette

Australian soap opera actresses
Australian women novelists
Living people
People from Ipswich, Queensland
1947 births
Australian expatriates in Bermuda